"Bloodstream" is a song recorded by English singer-songwriter Ed Sheeran from his second studio album, × (2014). It was written by Sheeran, Rudimental, and Snow Patrol members Johnny McDaid and Gary Lightbody, and produced by Rick Rubin.

The song was released as an "instant grat" digital download to the iTunes Store on 17 June 2014, serving as the fourth of seven promotional singles from ×. It entered the UK Singles Chart at number 81 and rose to number 60.

In December 2014, "Bloodstream" was remixed by Rudimental. This version of the song was released on 29 March 2015 as a joint single between Sheeran and Rudimental, serving as the fourth single from × and the lead single from Rudimental's second studio album, We the Generation (2015). This remix peaked at number 2 on the UK Singles Chart.

Background
"Bloodstream" was written by Sheeran, Rudimental, and Snow Patrol members – Johnny McDaid and Gary Lightbody, and produced by Rick Rubin at Shangri-La in Malibu, California. The song is about Sheeran taking MDMA during a wedding celebration in Ibiza. He claims that during the experience he "fell in love with a beanbag" and that "[he] felt anxiety, [he] felt love, [he] felt warm, [he] felt a bit weird". Sheeran made a live PA to perform the song during Rudimental's set at Glastonbury on 27 June 2014.

Charts

Certifications

Ed Sheeran and Rudimental version

At the BBC Music Awards on 11 December 2014, it was revealed by Sheeran that a remixed version of "Bloodstream" would serve as the fourth single from ×. He told MTV News, "I've done a song with Rudimental that is actually a song on my album. We've just re-done it and it's heavy, it's going to be great. They've re-done it, it's going to be sort of their first single off their new record...It's really good."

Background
In an interview with The Sun, regarding the collaboration, Rudimental's DJ Locksmith said, "We were working in LA and [Sheeran] rocked up to our studio with The Game and Ellie Goulding. We made four tracks and revisited one this year to give it a Rudimental spin. We've known Ed for years. I remember when we first saw him getting noticed by everyone, he gave us one of his tracks to remix and he said it was one of the best remixes he'd ever had. We'd never recorded with him before, but we kept the connection and he's a massive name now. The song is so sick, so insane. We can't wait to show it to people."

The reworked song's audio was uploaded on 11 February and the song was released on 29 March.

Music video
A music video featuring actor Ray Liotta was released on 23 March 2015. The video is directed by Emil Nava.

Live performances
Sheeran performed "Bloodstream" on 13 April 2015 on the results show of the second series of The X Factor in New Zealand.

Track listing

Charts and certifications

Weekly charts

Year-end charts

Certifications and sales

Release history

References

2014 songs
2015 singles
Ed Sheeran songs
Rudimental songs
Song recordings produced by Rick Rubin
Songs written by Ed Sheeran
Songs written by Gary Lightbody
Songs written by Johnny McDaid
Songs about drugs